Konkani Muslims (or Kokani Muslims) are an ethnoreligious subgroup of the Konkani people of the Konkani region along the west coast of India, who practice Islam. Nawayath Muslims from the North Canara district of Karnataka have similar origin as Konkani Muslims, but show a distinct ethnolinguistic identity due to geographical isolation of the Canara coast from the Konkan coast.

Geography 
The Konkani Muslim community forms a part of the larger Konkani-speaking demographic and are predominantly located in the Konkan division of the Indian state of Maharashtra. This includes the administrative districts of Mumbai, Mumbai Suburban, Palghar, Thane, Raigad, Ratnagiri, and Sindhudurg. 

There is a diaspora Konkani Muslim community based in Persian Gulf states, the United Kingdom, and South Africa. Some Konkani Muslims migrated to Pakistan during the Partition of India in 1947, and are presently settled in Karachi, as part of the larger Muhajir community.

History 
Since antiquity, the Konkan coast has had mercantile relations with major ports on the Red Sea and Persian Gulf. Konkani Muslims can trace their ancestry to Arab Muslim traders (from Hadhramaut in Yemen or South Arabia) who visited the Konkan coast between the seventh and eighth centuries AD, during the rule of the Chalukya and Rashtrakuta dynasties. Some Konkani Muslim settlements between the thirteenth and eighteenth centuries at the former ports of Dabhol and Chaul have been documented by chroniclers such as Ibn Battuta and Firishta. In the later eighteenth and early nineteenth centuries, Konkani Muslims became influential sailors, merchants, and government employees as the port city of Bombay (present Mumbai) began developing.

Demography 
Ancestry formed the basis for social stratification: direct descendants of Arab traders formed an elite class over those who had indirect descent through intermarriages with local converts to Islam. ((where?))  They are reportedly descendants of people who came from Hadhramaut (in Yemen or South Arabia), and other parts of Arabia and the Middle East. The Siddis have their roots in Africa.

Religion 
Konkani Muslims follow the Shafi'i school of Sunni Islamic jurisprudence. This is in contrast to the rest of North India and Deccan regions, where Sunni Muslims adhere to the Hanafi school.

Language 
Konkani Muslims speak a variety of dialects of Marathi collectively called Maharashtrian Konkani. Some of the dialects include Parabhi, Kunbi, Karadhi, Sangameshwari, and Bankoti. These form a gradual linguistic continuum between standard Marathi in regions around Mumbai and the Konkani language in regions around Goa.

In addition, the Muslims from south Sindhudurg, near Malvan, and the former princely state of Sawantwadi speak the Malvani Konkani dialect of the Konkani language.

Cuisine 
The cuisine of Konkani Muslims is non-vegetarian, mostly seafood. Its staple food is rice and bread made of rice (preferred at dinners) with fish and lentils or vegetables. It is mainly influenced by Maharashtrian cuisine. The southern portion of Konkan region has Malvani cuisine which overlaps with Maharashtrian and Goan cuisines.

Notable Konkani Muslims 

Abdul Rehman Antulay - Indian politician, ex-Chief Minister of Maharashtra
Liaquat Ali Asim -  Pakistani Urdu language poet
Hamid Dalwai - Writer and Social reformer
Husain Dalwai - Member of Parliament
Anjum Fakih - Actress and Model
Shafi Inamdar - Hindi film actor
Mohamed Zainuddin Juvale - Former Indian Naval Captain
Dawood Ibrahim Kaskar - Terrorist and crime lord; wanted by Interpol, FBI, and Indian authorities
Mukri - Hindi film actor
Zakir Naik - Islamic Preacher
Ghulam Parkar- Former Indian Cricketer
Imran Yusuf - Comedian
Arif Zakaria - Actor, nephew of Rafiq Zakaria
Fareed Zakaria - CNN anchor and political commentator, son of Rafiq Zakaria
Rafiq Zakaria - Politician and religious scholar
Urooj Ashfaq - Stand-Up Comedian

References

 Gazetteer of the Bombay. Presidency. Vol. X: Ratnagiri. and Savantwadi 
 Gazetteer of the Bombay Presidency. Vol. XVIII. Part. I: Poona
 Gazetteers Kolaba District

External links

 iKokani-A Complete Kokani Muslim Community Portal
 Konkani History
 Melting pot: Konkani Muslims in Kalyan hold on to their legacy amid urbanisation

 
Muslims
Muslims
Muslim communities of India
Social groups of Maharashtra
Muslim communities of Maharashtra
Social groups of Karnataka
Muslim communities of Karnataka
Social groups of Pakistan
Ethnic groups in South Africa
Sub-ethnic groups